"O Little Town of Bethlehem" is a Christmas carol. Based on an 1868 text written by Phillips Brooks, the carol is popular on both sides of the Atlantic, but to different tunes: in The United States, to "St. Louis" by Brooks' collaborator, Lewis Redner; and in the United Kingdom, Canada, and Ireland to "Forest Green", a tune collected by Ralph Vaughan Williams and first published in the 1906 English Hymnal.

Words
The text was written by Phillips Brooks (1835–1893), an Episcopal priest, then rector of Church of the Holy Trinity, Philadelphia and later of Trinity Church, Boston. He was inspired by visiting the village of Bethlehem in the Sanjak of Jerusalem in 1865. Three years later, he wrote the poem for his church, and his organist Lewis Redner (1831–1908) added the music.

Music

St Louis

Redner's tune, simply titled "St. Louis", is the tune used most often for this carol in the United States. Redner recounted the story of his composition:
As Christmas of 1868 approached, Mr. Brooks told me that he had written a simple little carol for the Christmas Sunday-school service, and he asked me to write the tune to it. The simple music was written in great haste and under great pressure. We were to practise it on the following Sunday. Mr. Brooks came to me on Friday, and said, "Redner, have you ground out that music yet to 'O Little Town of Bethlehem'?" I replied, "No", but that he should have it by Sunday. On the Saturday night previous my brain was all confused about the tune. I thought more about my Sunday-school lesson than I did about the music. But I was roused from sleep late in the night hearing an angel-strain whispering in my ear, and seizing a piece of music paper I jotted down the treble of the tune as we now have it, and on Sunday morning before going to church I filled in the harmony. Neither Mr. Brooks nor I ever thought the carol or the music to it would live beyond that Christmas of 1868.

My recollection is that Richard McCauley, who then had a bookstore on Chestnut Street west of Thirteenth Street, printed it on leaflets for sale. Rev. Dr. Huntington, rector of All Saints' Church, Worcester, Mass., asked permission to print it in his Sunday-school hymn and tune book, called The Church Porch, and it was he who christened the music "Saint Louis".

Forest Green

In the United Kingdom and the Commonwealth, and sometimes in the U.S. (especially in the Episcopal Church), the English hymn tune "Forest Green" is used instead. "Forest Green" was adapted by Ralph Vaughan Williams from an English folk ballad called "The Ploughboy's Dream" which he had collected from a Mr. Garman of Forest Green, Surrey in 1903. Henry Garman was born in 1830 in Sussex, and in the 1901 census was living in Ockley, Surrey; Vaughan Williams' manuscript notes he was a "labourer of Forest Green near Ockley – Surrey. ([aged] about 60?)", although Mr Garman would have been nearer 73 when he recited the tune. The tune has a strophic verse structure and is in the form A–A–B–A. Adapted into a hymn tune harmonised by Vaughan Williams, it was first published in the English Hymnal of 1906 (transcribed below).

Other versions
Two versions also exist by Henry Walford Davies, called "Wengen", or "Christmas Carol". "Wengen" was published in Hymns Ancient and Modern in 1922, meanwhile "Christmas Carol" is usually performed only by choirs rather than as a congregational hymn. This is because the first two verses are for treble voices with organ accompaniment, with only the final verse as a chorale/refrain harmony. This setting includes a recitative from the Gospel of Luke at the beginning, and cuts verses 2 and 4 of the original 5-verse carol. This version is often performed at the service of Nine Lessons and Carols in King's College, Cambridge.

William Rhys-Herbert included a new hymn-tune and harmonization as part of his 1909 cantata, Bethany.

The song has been included in many of the Christmas albums recorded by numerous singers in the modern era.

"Little Town" is an arrangement of "O Little Town of Bethlehem" by English singer-songwriter Chris Eaton. It was first recorded and released by English singer Cliff Richard in 1982 who had a Christmas hit with it in the UK. In the US, the better known version is by American CCM artist Amy Grant, released on her 1983 Christmas album.
A new tune for O little Town of Bethlehem called "Enmore" by the composer Philip Trumble was first published in 1987  Philip Trumble's was also published in the 2022 publication Christmas Praise

See also
 List of Christmas carols

References

External links

 Score of "Wengen": (pt 1, pt 2)
 , sung to the tune "Forest Green" (arr. Vaughan Williams, desc. Thomas Armstrong) by the Choir of King's College, Cambridge

1868 songs
Christmas carols
American Christmas songs
Compositions by Ralph Vaughan Williams
Songs about Jesus
Hymns in The English Hymnal